Ugonna Okegwo (born March 15, 1962) is a German-Nigerian jazz bassist and composer based in New York City.

Biography

Born in London, Okegwo is the son of Christel Katharina Lulf and Madueke Benedict Okegwo. In 1963 the family moved to Münster, Germany, where Okegwo grew up. As a youngster he enjoyed working with his hands and played the electric bass. At age 21, he took a class in violin-making and started playing the upright bass.

In 1986 Okegwo moved to Berlin and studied with bassist Jay Oliver and pianist Walter Norris. He then joined trombonist Lou Blackburn's group for a tour in Europe and played with Joe Newman, Oliver Jackson and Major Holley.

In 1989 Okegwo moved to New York City and worked with saxophonists Big Nick Nicholas, Junior Cook and James Spaulding. He worked with vocalist Jon Hendricks on a regular basis. He earned a bachelor's degree in Fine Arts from Long Island University, graduating summa cum laude in 1994. In the early 1990s Okegwo formed a trio with pianist Jacky Terrasson and drummer Leon Parker. In 1997 he started to perform regularly in Tom Harrell ensembles. He is a member of the Tom Harrell Quintet and the Mingus Big Band.

In 2002, Okegwo released his first album as a leader titled Uoniverse. About creating music Okegwo said, producing a note is human and personal and "in a rhythm section, the bass is the center, creating something constantly."

Okegwo has worked with a wide range of artists, including Kenny Barron, Michael Brecker, Benny Carter, Johnny Griffin, Wynton Marsalis, James Moody, Clark Terry, Pharoah Sanders, Steve Wilson, Michael Wolff, Bruce Barth, Steve Davis, Dario Chiazzolino, Lionel Hampton, Sam Newsome, Kurt Rosenwinkel and others.

Discography

As leader
 Uoniverse (Satchmo Jazz, 2002)

As sideman
Credits partly adapted from AllMusic. This list is incomplete.

With Tom Harrell
 Moving Picture (HighNote, 2017)
 Something Gold, Something Blue (HighNote, 2016)
 First Impressions (HighNote, 2015)
 TRIP (HighNote, 2014)
 Colors of a Dream (HighNote, 2013)
 Number Five (HighNote, 2012)
 The Time of the Sun (HighNote, 2011)
 Roman Nights (HighNote, 2010)
 Prana Dance (HighNote, 2009)
 Light On (HighNote, 2007)
 The Art of Rhythm (RCA Victor, 1998)

 With LaVerne Butler
 Love Lost and Found Again (HighNote, 2012)

With Peter Zak
 The Decider (SteepleChase, 2009)

With Dan Faulk
 Dan Faulk Songbook, Vol.1 (Ugli Fruit, 2002)

With Jacky Terrasson
 A Paris... (Blue Note, 2001)
 What It Is (Blue Note, 1999)
 Alive (Blue Note, 1998)
 Reach (Blue Note, 1996)
 Jacky Terrasson (Blue Note, 1994)
 Lover Man (Venus, 2002, Recorded 1993)

With Sam Newsome
 Global Unity (Palmetto, 2001)
 The Tender Side of Sammy Straighthor (SteepleChase, 2000) 
 This Masquerade (SteepleChase, 2000)

With Jon Hendricks
 Boppin' at the Blue Note (Telarc, 1994)

References

External links
 
 

British jazz musicians
American jazz double-bassists
Male double-bassists
Musicians from New York City
Long Island University alumni
Living people
1962 births
Jazz musicians from New York (state)
21st-century double-bassists
21st-century American male musicians
American male jazz musicians